Bear River Migratory Bird Refuge is a  National Wildlife Refuge in Utah, established in 1928. The refuge is part of a national system of fee ownership lands purchased from willing sellers, mostly private property owners.

The refuge encompasses the Bear River and its delta where it flows into the northern part of the Great Salt Lake in eastern Box Elder County. It includes a variety of habitats, such as open water, mudflats, wetlands, and uplands. The refuge hosts millions of migratory birds each year including species such as bald eagle and tundra swan. The Refuge is approx. 80,000 acres of Federal and State lands that are managed by the U.S. Fish and Wildlife Service. The surrounding lands are occupied by multiple hunting clubs along the bird migration route.

The James V. Hansen Wildlife Education Center features interactive exhibits about the birds and wetlands of the Refuge and a 1/2-mile accessible walking trail a wetland habitat outside. Environmental education programs, symposiums and public events are offered.

There is a one-way 12 mile auto route through the Refuge, with an audio tour and map available for download through the official website.

Starting in 1983, rising floodwaters from the Great Salt Lake severely impacted the refuge.  The flooding of the refuge is at the center of Terry Tempest Williams's noted nonfiction book, Refuge: An Unnatural History of Family and Place. In 2006, a new wildlife education center off Interstate 15 opened to attract visitors once more.

See also
 National Wildlife Refuge
 List of National Wildlife Refuges

References

External links 

 Bear River Migratory Bird Refuge
 Official Web site of the Blue Goose Alliance
 Christopher Chadbourne and Associates, Inc., Exhibit Design firm for the Education Center

National Wildlife Refuges in Utah
Protected areas of Box Elder County, Utah
Education in Box Elder County, Utah
Nature centers in Utah
1927 establishments in Utah
Wetlands of Utah
Landforms of Box Elder County, Utah
Bird migration